Colin Alistair Ronan FRAS (4 June 1920, in London – 1 June 1995) was a British author and specialist in the history and philosophy of science.

Education
Colin Alistair Ronan was educated at Abingdon School in Abingdon-on-Thames, Oxfordshire from 1934 to 1937.

Military service
He served in the British Army from 1940 to 1946, achieving the rank of major.

Career
After the war, he obtained a BSc in Astronomy and took an administrative post at the secretariat of The Royal Society. There, he did an MSc in the History and Philosophy of Science under Herbert Dingle at University College London.

After leaving the Royal Society he took up writing, and during a long career, he was an author produced over forty books, mainly on astronomy, and the history and philosophy of science. Later, he collaborated with Joseph Needham on an abridgement of Needham's great work on China, producing The Shorter Science and Civilisation in China in several volumes.

He was elected to the British Astronomical Association (BAA) on 26 January 1938. He went on to be Historical Section Director from 1953 to 1965, Journal Editor from 1965 to 1985, and President from 1989 to 1991, during which time the association celebrated its centenary. On the 12 February 1943 Ronan was elected to the fellowship of the Royal Astronomical Society.

In 1991, Ronan delivered a Presidential Address to the BAA in which he argued that Leonard Digges, father of Thomas Digges was the originator of the reflecting telescope sometime between 1540 and 1559, over a century before Isaac Newton, who is usually credited with having built the first such telescope around 1668.

For a considerable period in the 1980s and early 1990s, he collaborated with Sir Patrick Moore in lecture tours. They took the form of weekend residential symposia on single topics such as the return of Halley's Comet. Notable and hilarious, the interplay between Ronan's sober and intellectual analysis along with Moore's more extravagant character led frequent disagreements that were usually solved over several bottles of red wine. The weekends were an enormous success and made a valuable and irreplaceable contribution to the amateur astronomical scene.

With his second wife, Ann, he founded the Ronan Picture Library, which specialises in scientific and historical pictures. Among his many books on the history of science were studies of scientists such as Galileo, William Herschel and Edmond Halley. He also wrote scientific books for children, along with books such as The Practical Astronomer (1981), written for beginner amateur astronomers.

Ronan had an asteroid named in honour of his achievements: 4024 Ronan belongs to the Floras family, discovered by E. Bowell on 24 November 1981 at Anderson Mesa Station.

Bibliography

See also
 List of Old Abingdonians

References

1920 births
1995 deaths
20th-century British astronomers
British science writers
People educated at Abingdon School